Collins is an unincorporated census-designated place in the town of Rockland, Manitowoc County, Wisconsin, United States, in the east central part of the state. Its zip code is 54207, although its post office is being studied for closure. As of the 2010 census, its population is 164. The Collins Marsh Wildlife Area is located east of the community. Wisconsin Highway 32 ran through the community; the route later became Wisconsin Highway 67 before it became County Highway W. County Highway JJ and the Wisconsin Central Ltd. railroad runs east–west through the community. The community was named for Sumner J. Collins, who was the general superintendent of the Wisconsin Central Railroad in the 1890s.

Notable people
Martin Rappel, farmer, politician and businessman, lived in Collins and was involved with the Collins State Bank.

Images

Notes

Census-designated places in Manitowoc County, Wisconsin
Census-designated places in Wisconsin